Nogometni klub Tromejnik Kuzma, commonly referred to as NK Tromejnik or simply Tromejnik, is a Slovenian football club which plays in the town of Kuzma. The club was established in 1979.

Honours
Pomurska League (fourth tier)
 Winners: 2008–09

Slovenian Fifth Division
 Winners: 1994–95

MNZ Murska Sobota Cup
 Winners: 2011–12, 2013–14

League history since 1994

References

Association football clubs established in 1979
Football clubs in Slovenia
1979 establishments in Slovenia